Moldavskie Vedomosti is a newspaper from Chişinău, the Republic of Moldova, founded by Dumitru Ciubaşenco in 1995. During the presidency of Vladimir Voronin it was considered the main opposition newspaper of the country.

See also
 List of newspapers in Moldova

References

External links
 vedomosti.md

Publications established in 1995
Newspapers published in Moldova
Mass media in Chișinău